The 2014 Tour of Belgium was the 84th edition of the Tour of Belgium cycling stage race. It took place from 28 May to 1 June 2014 in Belgium, and was a part of the 2014 UCI Europe Tour.

Schedule

Teams
20 teams were invited to the 2014 Tour of Belgium: 6 UCI ProTeams, 7 UCI Professional Continental Teams and 7 UCI Continental Teams.

Stages

Stage 1
28 May 2014 – Lochristi to Buggenhout,

Stage 2
29 May 2014 – Lierde to Knokke-Heist,

Stage 3
30 May 2014 – Diksmuide, individual time trial (ITT)

Stage 4
31 May 2014 – Eau d'Heure lakes to Eau d'Heure lakes,

Stage 5
1 June 2014 – Oreye to Oreye,

Classification leadership table

Standings

General classification

Points classification

Combativity classification

Young rider classification

Team classification

References

External links

Tour of Belgium
Tour of Belgium
Tour of Belgium